The 1987–88 BCAFL was the third full season of the British Collegiate American Football League, organised by the British Students American Football Association.

Changes from last season

Division changes
A third Conference (Southern) was added.

Team changes
Cardiff University joined the Southern Conference, playing as the Cobras
University of East Anglia joined the Southern Conference, playing as the Pirates
Leicester Lemmings moved from Northern to Southern Conference
Newcastle Scholars moved from Scottish to Northern Conference
University of Reading joined the Southern Conference, playing as the Knights
This increased the number of teams playing to 11

Regular season

Scottish Conference

Northern Conference

Southern Conference

Playoffs

Note 1 - the title was shared, as the final was still tied after three periods of Overtime.
Note 2 - the table does not indicate who played home or away in each fixture.

References

External links
 Official BUAFL Website
 Official BAFA Website

1987-88
1987 in British sport
1988 in British sport
1987 in American football
1988 in American football